Kinesin-like protein KIF23 is a protein that in humans is encoded by the KIF23 gene.

Function

In cell division 

KIF23 (also known as Kinesin-6, CHO1/MKLP1, C. elegans ZEN-4 and Drosophila Pavarotti) is a member of kinesin-like protein family. This family includes microtubule-dependent molecular motors that transport organelles within cells and move chromosomes during cell division. This protein has been shown to cross-bridge antiparallel microtubules and drive microtubule movement in vitro. Alternate splicing of this gene results in two transcript variants encoding two different isoforms, better known as CHO1, the larger isoform and MKLP1, the smaller isoform.  KIF23 is a plus-end directed motor protein expressed in mitosis, involved in the formation of the cleavage furrow in late anaphase and in cytokinesis. KIF23 is part of the centralspindlin complex that includes PRC1, Aurora B and 14-3-3 which cluster together at the spindle midzone to enable anaphase in dividing cells.

In neurons 

In neuronal development KIF23 is involved in the transport of minus-end distal microtubules into dendrites and is expressed exclusively in cell bodies and dendrites.  Knockdown of KIF23 by antisense oligonucleotides and by siRNA both cause a significant increase in axon length and a decrease in dendritic phenotype in neuroblastoma cells and in rat neurons.  In differentiating neurons, KIF23 restricts the movement of short microtubules into axons by acting as a "brake" against the driving forces of cytoplasmic dynein. As neurons mature, KIF23 drives minus-end distal microtubules into nascent dendrites contributing to the multi-polar orientation of dendritic microtubules and the formation of their short, fat, tapering morphology.

Interactions 

KIF23 has been shown to interact with:
 ARF3,
 AURKB,
 BIRC6, and
 PRC1.

Mutation and diseases 

KIF23 has been implicated in the formation and proliferation of GL261 gliomas in mouse.

References

Further reading

External links